The Casio fx-3900Pv is a programmable scientific calculator with 300 steps. Introduced in 1992, its production has since stopped with the introduction of fx-3650P and fx-3950P.

External links
Program of fx-3900Pv

fx-3900Pv
Products introduced in 1992